"Makin' Whoopee" is a jazz/blues song, first popularized by Eddie Cantor in the 1928 musical Whoopee!. Gus Kahn wrote the lyrics and Walter Donaldson composed the music for the song as well as for the entire musical.

The title refers to celebrating a marriage. Eventually "making whoopee" became a euphemism for intimate sexual relations.
The song has been called a "dire warning", largely to men, about the "trap" of marriage.
"Makin' Whoopee" begins with the celebration of a wedding, honeymoon and marital bliss, but moves on to babies and responsibilities, and ultimately on to affairs and possible divorce, ending with a judge's advice.

Other versions

1928 George Olsen and His Music. Released by Victor on November 12, 1928 as catalog number 21816-A. Vocal refrain by Fran Frey.
1928 Bing Crosby recorded the song on December 22, 1928 with the Paul Whiteman Orchestra. It made #8 on the Billboard charts.
1929 Rudy Vallée recorded the song for his album Dancing in the Moonlight in 1929
1947 The King Cole Trio recorded the song August 7, 1947 in Los Angeles (2139-3 (Capitol 10101, 1669)).
1951 Doris Day recorded the song in a duet with Danny Thomas in November 1951. It was released on the 10" soundtrack-LP I'll See You in My Dreams by Columbia Records as catalog number CL-6198 on December 14, 1952. Conductor: Paul Weston. She recorded a new version in November 1958. It was released on the LP Cuttin' Capers by Columbia Records as catalog number CS-8078 (stereo) and CL-1232 (mono) on March 9, 1959. Conductor: Frank De Vol.
1953 Gerry Mulligan performed a version with Chet Baker in 1953, and then performed it live with Jon Eardley in 1954.
1956 Frank Sinatra. Released on the LP Songs For Swingin' Lovers by Capitol Records as catalog number W-653 in 1956.
1956 Dinah Washington. Released on the LP The Swingin' Miss "D" by EmArcy Records as catalog number MG 36104 in 1956. Arranger and conductor: Quincy Jones. Producer: Bob Shad.
1957 Louis Armstrong.  Released as a bonus track on the CD Louis Armstrong Meets Oscar Peterson 1957. 
1957 Louis Armstrong and Ella Fitzgerald. Released on the double LP Ella and Louis Again by Verve as catalog number MGV 4006-2 1957 and reissued in 2006 on a 2 CD-set as Verve 0602517036918. 
1958 Ella Fitzgerald. Recorded at the Radio Recorders, Hollywood, on November 24, 1958. It was released on the LP Ella Fitzgerald Sings Sweet Songs for Swingers by Verve Records as catalogue number VS-6072 (stereo) and V-4032 (mono) in 1959. Arranger and conductor was Frank De Vol.
1959 Bill Doggett recorded an instrumental version on his 1959 album Big City Dance Party, King Records KS-641.
1959 Marlene Dietrich performed the song on her 1959 live album Dietrich in Rio.
1960 The McGuire Sisters recorded the song on their 1960 album "His and Hers."
1967 Don Lusher, Orchestra directed by Pete Moore. Released on the LP Makin' Whoopee by CBS Records as catalog number 63021 in 1967.
Ray Charles sang a humorous version of "Makin Whoopee" live while playing the piano.
1973 Harry Nilsson performed the song on his 1973 album A Little Touch of Schmilsson in the Night.
1973 Hawkeye Pierce. It was played on a gramophone at the Swamp and partially sung by Hawkeye Pierce (Alan Alda) at the end of an episode of M*A*S*H titled "Dear Dad... Three".
1980 Yoko Ono under the title "I'm Your Angel" and with altered lyrics, 1980, Double Fantasy 
1989 Dr. John and Rickie Lee Jones performed "Makin' Whoopee" on Dr. John's album In a Sentimental Mood. It was released by Warner Bros. Records, earning a Grammy Award in 1989.
1989 Branford Marsalis performed a cover in 1989 for his album Trio Jeepy. It would later be the first song that was ever played on VH1 Smooth on August 1, 1998.
1989 Michelle Pfeiffer sang "Makin' Whoopee", sprawled over a piano in a red evening dress, in the 1989 film The Fabulous Baker Boys. 
1997 Vicki Lewis and Phil Hartman performed the song in the 1997 NewsRadio episode "Stupid Holiday Charity Talent Show."
2003 Cyndi Lauper covered the song as a duet with Tony Bennett on her 2003 studio album At Last.
2004 Elton John performs on the Best Buy 2004 Christmas CD "Sweet Tracks"
2005 Rod Stewart and Elton John perform a duet of the song on Stewart’s album Thanks for the Memory: The Great American Songbook, Volume IV.
2005 Timothy Spall and Eddie Marsan performed a version of the song in the 2005 film Pierrepoint.
2011 Amanda Palmer released her version on the 2011 album "Amanda Palmer Goes Down Under"
2012 Rachael MacFarlane released it on her debut album Hayley Sings.

In advertising
Pepsi used the melody of "Makin' Whoopee" with new lyrics, sung by Joanie Sommers, for its advertising campaign "Now It's Pepsi -- For Those Who Think Young" starting in 1961.
Heinz created a 1993 commercial in which a bottle of ketchup and a bottle of salsa "make whoopee" in a refrigerator, resulting in a salsa-style ketchup.

In popular culture
The song appears in BioShock Infinite, performed by Rudy Vallée.
This song appears in Miss Fisher's Murder Mysteries Season 1, Episode 6, Ruddy Gore, 2012.
This song is included in the Simpsons episode "The Fabulous Faker Boy" making reference to the 1989 film "The Fabulous Baker Boys" in the scene where actress Michelle Pfeiffer sings this song.
The song is included on the video game Mafia 2.
The song is included in the Family Guy episode Lottery Fever, where Quagmire and Joe sing the song while Peter Griffin shoots them with a BB gun.
The song is also included in American Dad Love A.D Style, Hailey sings the song in Roger’s Bar.
Deputy Lupo (Erica Cerra) performs the song in Season 3, Episode 10 of Eureka.
The song was parodied on Sesame Street in 1995 as “Eating Cookie”, written by Josh Selig and performed by Frank Oz as Cookie Monster.

References

Songs with music by Walter Donaldson
Songs with lyrics by Gus Kahn
Pop standards
Songs from musicals
1928 songs
Songs about marriage
Eddie Cantor songs
Frank Sinatra songs
Nat King Cole songs
Bing Crosby songs
Doris Day songs
Ella Fitzgerald songs
The McGuire Sisters songs
Cyndi Lauper songs
Tony Bennett songs